Scurria plana is a species of sea snail, a true limpet, a marine gastropod mollusc in the family Lottiidae, one of the families of true limpets.

Description

Distribution

References

Lottiidae
Gastropods described in 1846